The  as the German army and part of the  inherited its uniforms and rank structure from the  of the Weimar Republic (1921–1935). There were few alterations and adjustments made as the army grew from a limited peacetime defense force of 100,000 men to a war-fighting force of several million men.

The Nazi Party also had its own series of paramilitary uniforms and insignia.

Insignia

National Emblem:  or  
The  visual acknowledgement of the new National Socialist reality came on 17 February 1934, when the Commander-in-Chief, Werner von Blomberg, ordered the Nazi Party eagle-and-swastika, then Germany's National Emblem, to be worn on uniform blouses and headgear effective 1 May.

Breast eagle 

On tunics this took the form of a cloth patch about 9 cm (3⅝") wide worn on the right breast, above the pocket. For enlisted uniforms it was jacquard-woven ("BeVo") or sometimes machine-embroidered in silver-grey rayon, for officers machine- or hand-embroidered in white silk or bright aluminum wire, and for generals hand-embroidered in gold bullion. The backing was "badge-cloth", a close-woven velvetish fabric; this was originally  grey, but in late 1935 the renamed  changed its  color to a dark blue-green called  (bottle-green).

The war brought several variations to the breast eagle, although it should be kept in mind that none of them was replaced or de-authorized, and all were being worn side by side at war's end. When hostilities began in 1939, on the enlisted  or field blouse the eagle was changed from silver-white to matte grey for reduced visibility; and in 1940 backings began to be produced in field-grey. Another version appeared with the advent of the Model 1944 Field Blouse, which used a triangular backing for speed and simplicity of manufacture.

There were also versions for other uniforms: both white and grey variants on black for the Panzer uniform, and in dull grey-blue on tan backing for the tropical uniform. A stamped metal pin-on breast eagle was worn with the officers' white summer tunic.

Headgear 
 
Caps and helmets bore two common insignia elements, in various forms: the National Emblem and the national colors. World War I caps had carried dual cockades or roundels, one in Imperial black-white-red and one in the colors of the particular State within the Empire. The  changed this to a single cockade in the Weimar Republic's black, red and gold; almost as soon as Hitler took power he restored the pre-1919 tricolor flag, and ordered the Army to return to black-white-red.

Belt buckles 

Officers' field and service buckles were of a two-pronged frame type. Generals' were the same but gilt or gold-plated.

With the tropical uniform and its belt of cotton webbing, officers wore a buckle identical to the dress buckle but painted olive-drab.

Collar patch 

In 19th century German armies, Guard and other elite regiments wore lengths of double braid encircling all or most of the collar as a mark of distinction. By the middle of World War I these ornate collars had been reduced to an embroidered representation of short lengths of braid joined at the ends, sewn to patches worn at the front of the collar.

For clarification, however, a distinction must be made between a "collar patch", and NCO braid ( or  – the badge of rank of all German NCO ranks), encircling the collar of the uniform tunic. An NCO wore both collar patches and the braid encircling the collar. Commissioned officers wore collar patches only.

Design and versions 

On both collar points of any uniform jacket there was a collar patch. Each patch consisted of the padding, and two parallel facings, the so-called , symbolising the double braid of the 19th century.

The padding of full-dress collar patches showed the wearer's  (corps color). The dress tunic version was embroidered in fine aluminum thread on a patch of badge cloth. The backing also showed through in the space between the two parallel facings of the collar patch, and formed so a colour center stripe.

For enlisted men, service collar patches were machine-woven in silver-grey rayon; COs' were embroidered more elaborately in white silk or aluminium thread, and were somewhat larger to match their higher collars.

NCOs wore standard enlisted collar patches but were distinguished by a strip of 9mm silver-grey diamond-woven rayon braid (NCO-), sewn around the collar, except on the dress, where the NCO- was bright aluminum. However, the aluminum-embroidered NCO- on dress uniforms encircled the collar's upper edge, the simpler NCO- on service – or field uniform encircled the collar's lower edge.

Universal design from 1938 

By 1938 the fast-growing  had found that it was impractical, for the enlisted field uniform, to manufacture and stock a multitude of collar patches in assorted  which also had to be sewn on and frequently changed by unit tailors.

With the wartime change to lower-visibility insignia enlisted collar patches were woven in matte "mouse-grey" stripes, which were at first sewn to green collar patches as before but increasingly directly to the collar, which beginning in 1940 was made in  like the uniform; grey collar patches were never produced. The troops however preferred the green patches (and collars) if they had or could get them, especially on "clean" uniforms for walking-out; and long-service veterans took particular pride in pre-38 versions.

In contrast, officers' service uniform collar patches never changed. While most officers in the front lines wore the enlisted field uniform as per wartime regulations, many opted to have their green-and-silver collar patches added instead of (or on top of) the factory versions.

On olive tropical uniforms the collar patches were tan with dull grey-blue  for all personnel; officers again sometimes added their green collar patches. Tropical NCO collar  were copper-brown, or sometimes olive drab.

Armored vehicle uniforms

These skulls took the form of white-metal pins attached to black  which were edged in  piping.

In mid-1940 crews of assault guns received a uniform of their own, identical in cut to the  but in standard field-grey, which they wore with red artillery piping. Over the course of the war a bewildering and changing series of regulations governed the uniforms and insignia for assault guns, tank destroyers, armored cars and self-propelled guns (SPG). Depending on the unit and the date either the black or grey wrap or the standard  might be authorized, and on the grey "assault gun" jacket the regulation collar patches could be black with skulls, or grey with skulls, or no device at all. The result in practice was chaos; wartime photos show a mix of uniforms and insignia worn not only in the same battalion, but even in the same vehicle.

Officially both colours of panzer wrap were working and field uniforms to be worn only in or around the vehicle; this regulation was universally ignored.  were issued standard uniforms for service-dress and walking out but rarely wore them, much preferring their unique jackets.

In North Africa, AFV crews wore the same tropical uniform as the other branches, including collar patches; many tankers however pinned their  badges to their lapels.

In June 1939, the Wehrmacht Heer wanted to renew its ties with the Old Army tradition by introducing a new uniform for its most prestigious unit:  which was renamed Infantry Regiment "Großdeutschland". The new dress uniform for I.R. "" had an elongated collar patch with single  for NCOs and two for enlisted. Although shown to the press, this new uniform was not provided to the unit due to the outbreak of World War II and was placed in depot storage.

General Staff Corps Officers 

 were officers carefully selected and trained to represent the German General Staff Corps in both command and staff functions. On division staffs they held the position of Ia (operational chief of staff) or Ib (chief of the rear echelon). In the higher echelons, the intelligence and training staff sections were most of the time in the personal charge of General Staff Corps officers. These were the same whether on carmine dress  or green service patches; colored  were unnecessary. These  were called "", etc. The special golden Litzen were abolished in November 1942. Only Military attaches kept their Litzen as long as they were in their present position. The Führer wanted a closer union between the front and the OKW and OKH.

In addition to their collar patches, General Staff Officers wore trouser-stripes, of the same design as generals' but in carmine rather than scarlet.

Generals 

Field Marshals wore the same  as generals until April 1941, when they were authorized a longer variant with three rather than two iterations of the repeating pattern, for a total of six "prongs". In some cases GFM did not bother to replace their generals' tabs, or did so only on their dress uniforms.

General officers of the Special Troop Service ( – TDS) and of the specialist careers (medical, veterinary, ordnance, and motor park) wore the same insignia until April 1944, when they were ordered to exchange their scarlet  for  tabs backed in their respective 

  – TDS administrative;
  – medical;
  – ordnance;
  – motor park;
  – veterinary;
  – TDS judiciary.

In October 1944, the wear-out period of the scarlet backing color for Generals of the specialist careers was extended for an undetermined period.

These arabesque collar patches are still worn today by general officers of the present-day Bundeswehr.

Chief 

It was a German custom dating from the late 18th century. These generals were authorized to wear the tunic and insignia of an officer of the regiment, including ordinary officers' .

Hitler appointed first  Hans von Seeckt, ancient , to be  of the 67th Infantry Regiment on his 70th birthday in April 1936, a few months before he died. Only seven German generals were appointed s: in addition to Seeckt and Rundstedt they were  Ritter von Epp ( of the 61st Infantry Regiment in Munich);  von Mackensen ( of the 5th Cavalry Regiment in Stolp);  von Fritsch ( of the 12th Artillery Regiment in Schwerin); and  von Böhm-Ermolli ( of the 28th Infantry Regiment in Troppau).  von Blomberg was appointed  of the 73rd Infantry Regiment and wore a big 73 superimposed over the crossed batons of his shoulder board, but on 4 February 1938 he was dismissed and his name was deleted from the seniority list.

Shoulder-straps and shoulder boards

Enlisted men 

The  shoulder-straps to enlisted men were very similar to those of World War I, made of  uniform cloth with pointed or "gable" button ends. In December 1934 the material was changed to grey badge-cloth and in September 1935 changed again to dark bottle-green. These "first pattern" shoulder-straps were not edged in  piping.

This pattern would be used through the end of the war, although in 1940 manufacture reverted to field-grey uniform cloth, and as usual alternate versions were made to go with the Panzer uniform (black), tropical uniform (olive cotton) and HBT summer uniform (reed-green twill).  were not worn with the fatigue uniform, nor with camouflage smocks and parkas which used an alternate system of rank insignia.

For junior enlisted men, rank insignia if any was worn on the left sleeve. However the epaulettes did indicate the wearer's unit (usually regiment or independent battalion) together with his sub-branch if any, machine-embroidered in branch-color. The German Army used a very large assortment of Latin initials, Gothic initials, script ciphers, Arabic numerals, Roman numerals and symbols to designate all its various service branches and installations. Before the war, shoulder-buttons were embossed with the number of the wearer's company as well, this practice was discontinued "for the duration."

Beginning in January 1940, shoulder-straps with unit insignia were (supposed to be) phased out as a security measure, and removable fabric loops with devices were issued instead.

NCOs 

Non-commissioned officers wore their rank insignia on their shoulder-straps, consisting of braid and white-metal rank stars. Senior NCO's added one to three stars; in addition, their unit identifiers took the form of white-metal insignia rather than embroidery.

Shoulder-straps were made in both a standard width (4.5 cm, 1¾") and a wider one for three-digit unit numbers (5.3 cm, 2"), and in three lengths depending on the size of the man. There was in addition an extra-large size for the overcoat.

Officers 

Officers' shoulder boards were constructed from "Russia" braid, an aluminum-thread double piping. Company-grade officers ( through ) wore epaulettes constructed by wrapping two side-by-side lengths of braid around the buttonhole and back, giving the appearance of eight parallel cords; the whole was sewn to an underlay of  badge-cloth. Until 1938 the underlay was of the same outer dimensions as the braid, and only visible edge-on; in that year the underlay was made wider, so as to create the impression of edge piping like the enlisted shoulder-strap. Rank was indicated by zero to two gilt-metal rank stars; unit designators were also of gilt metal.

Field-grade officer shoulder boards were made by plaiting together double widths of Russia braid and looping them to form a buttonhole, sewn to a  underlay; rank again was displayed by zero to two gilt stars.

Once the war began, dull grey aluminum braid appeared, but bright aluminum continued in use.

Generals 

 1  (Shoulder strap from April 1941)
 2  (Shoulder strap prior to April 1941)
 3 
 4 
 5 
 6 

Since the resulting combination was wider, generals' boards were plaited in four 'loops' rather than five. Their buttons were gilt, and rank was indicated by zero to three silver rank stars, or crossed batons in the case of field marshals. The underlay was scarlet, except (from 1944) for generals of staff corps, who were instructed to wear  instead.

In April 1941,  epaulettes were changed to incorporate a central gold cord instead of silver.

Retired personnel 
By order of Marshal Hindenburg in March 1932, soldiers who retired after 15 years of service received the right to wear the uniform of the unit they left. The shoulder boards and shoulder straps of retired soldiers had a bridle 1.5 cm wide attached under the middle.

Other insignia

Denim insignia 
During the winter of 1938, certain rank were issued insignia to the wear with the denim uniform.

Smock/parka rank insignia 

When wearing uniforms without epaulettes, such as smocks, parkas and mountain windbreakers; generals, officers and NCOs instead wore sleeve rank insignia. These were made up of bars & oak leaves and were introduced by the late summer of 1942. The ranks were used by the army and the Waffen-SS.

Tassels 
First introduced in the Prussian army in 1808, the coloured sidearm tassels were used as a decorative piece of equipment and to differentiate between companies within a regiment. The  was used by infantry, artillery, pioneer, signal, anti-tank and supply troops. Additionally, some units would wear honorary tassels of Russian red leather, to indicate their relation to the 1st Regiment of (Prussian) Grenadier Guards.  would wear tassels independently of their company relations.

The tassels are shown below, where Arabic numerals refer to the company/battery/squadron:

Ranks and rank insignia

Rank tables

Enlisted personnel

Non-commissioned officers 

:  was not a rank but an appointment: the administrative and mustering NCO of a company and the commander's logistical assistant. A  however had to be 

Senior non-commissioned specialist officers 
In two specialist career paths it was possible to attain rank above : fortifications engineers and farriers. They were actual NCOs with command authority, not  (uniformed Army civil servants). There was no direct equivalent in the English-speaking world; perhaps the closest examples of the time would be the British Royal Navy's and United States Navy's ranks of Warrant Officer.

These men wore shoulder boards braided in a unique pattern, orange-red and silver on black underlay with Gothic "Fp" for fortress engineers, and gold-yellow and silver on carmine with a horseshoe device for farriers.

Officer candidates

Officers

General officers and marshals 

From May 1944 generals in the various staff corps (medical, legal, TSD etc.) were supposed to replace  with the appropriate  of their branches of service; in practice this directive was imperfectly heeded and a subsequent order extended the wear-out date for scarlet insignia indefinitely.

Ranks at the Private/Senior Private levels

Armed Forces officials and

Armed Forces officials 

Officials in administrative, legal, and technical service positions were usually placed in a category unique to the Wehrmacht. They consist of civil service personnel performing functions within the Armed Forces and are recruited, in part, from former professional non-commissioned officers who became military candidates for civil service at the end of their 12-year contractual period of active military service.

Up to 1944, none of these officials were classified as soldiers; in that year certain groups were converted into officers in the Special Troop Service ( or TSD). These were the higher administrative officers in ranks from captain to lieutenant general; the lower administrative officers in the ranks of first and second lieutenant, and the judge advocates in ranks from captain to lieutenant general. At this time all personnel of the Field Post Office were made soldiers as well, but formed a corps of their own rather than belonging to the TSD. It was also made possible for qualified reserve technical service officials to become reserve officers of the motor maintenance troops.

The officials had titles, not ranks: . This is a complex subject as each branch had its own titles.

Military officials

Shoulder boards 

With certain exceptions, military officials wore shoulder boards similar to those of soldiers of equivalent rank, but distinguished by the addition of dark green elements: those equivalent to generals had a central cord in their braided shoulder boards which incorporated green chevrons, and those equivalent to officers wore a narrow green stripe between the rows of braid. WO-equivalent officials wore a complex braided shoulderboard made of green, black and silver cords.

Most officials wore in addition to their dark green  a secondary colour denoting their branch:

In March 1940 distinct  were abolished and replaced with light grey.

Collar patches 
 wore distinctive collar patches; these tabs indicated not the official's rank or title, but rather the "grade" of the service in which the official was employed.

General officer-equivalents wore green patches with generals' arabesques, similarly bordered.

These men had needed skills but either did not possess all the qualifications to become full-fledged , or were effectively drafted from civilian jobs. The matter was further confused by the fact that  did the same jobs and held the same titles as career officials.

Nonetheless,  wore entirely distinct collar patches. The backing patch was large and piped on three sides like that worn by career , but was light grey edged in green. The device was a rectangle pointed at the upper end with braid down the center, much like a British general's gorget patch, the colors indicating the degree of the  service: grey with green braid for basic services, silver with green braid for middle and elevated services, and gold on gold for higher services.

Military Supreme Court officials 
Officials of the Wehrmacht who worked in Military Supreme Courts wore shoulder straps without the "HV" and had the secondary colour of Bordeaux red (').

(short: Sdf; or Sf) – in the meaning of specialist leader (literal: special leader) – introduced to the Wehrmacht in the year 1937, wore the standard military uniform but their collars and cap bands were blue-grey rather than Army green, with unique shoulder and collar insignia.

See also 
 World War II German uniforms
 Waffenfarbe
 Glossary of German World War II military terms
 Comparative officer ranks of World War II

Notes

References

Citations

Bibliography

External links 

 German WWII Army & SS Rank & Insignia
 German Army ranks

Military insignia
Wehrmacht
 
Military of Nazi Germany
Embroidery in Germany